Sara Chevaugeon (born 12 February 1993) is a French basketball player for Flammes Carolo and the French national team.

She represented France at the FIBA Women's EuroBasket 2019.

References

External links

1993 births
Living people
Guards (basketball)
French women's basketball players
Sportspeople from La Rochelle